The Amur, or Heilong Jiang ("Black Dragon River"), is the world's tenth longest river, forming the border between the Russian Far East and Northeastern China (Inner Manchuria). The river basin is home to a variety of large predatory fish such as northern snakehead, Amur pike, taimen, Amur catfish, predatory carp and yellowcheek, as well as the northernmost populations of the Amur softshell turtle and Indian lotus.

Name 
The Russian name Amur comes the Tungusic term for “river”. Tungusic peoples are an ethno-linguistic group formed by the speakers of Tungusic languages (or Manchu–Tungus languages). They are native to Siberia and Northeast Asia.

Historically, it was common to refer to a river simply as "water". There are similar words for "water" or "river" in a number of Asiatic languages: e.g. 물 mul ("water") in Korean, muren or mörön ("river") in Mongolian, and 水 midu > mizu ("water") in Japanese. The name "Amur" may have evolved from a root word for water, coupled with a size modifier for "Big Water".

Its ancient Chinese names were Yushui, Wanshui and Heishui, formed from variants to shui, meaning "water". The modern Chinese name for the river, Heilongjiang means "Black Dragon River", while the Manchurian name Sahaliyan Ula, the Mongolian names " Amar mörön " (Cyrillic: Амар мөрөн) originates from the name " Amar " meaning to rest and Khar mörön (Cyrillic: Хар мөрөн) mean Black River.

Course

At Huma, it is joined by a major tributary, the Huma He. Afterwards it continues to flow south until, between the cities of Blagoveshchensk in Russia and Heihe in China, it widens significantly as it is joined by one of its most important tributaries the Zeya.

The Amur arcs to the east and turns southeast again at the confluence with the Bureya, then does not receive another significant tributary for nearly  before its confluence with its largest tributary, the Songhua, at Tongjiang. At the confluence with the Songhua the river turns northeast, now flowing towards Khabarovsk, where it joins the Ussuri and ceases to define the Russia–China border. Now the river spreads out dramatically into a braided character, flowing north-northeast through a wide valley in eastern Russia, passing Amursk and Komsomolsk-on-Amur.

During years with heavy precipitation, the Amur river system is connected with the Kherlen river. The normally exit−less endorheic lake Hulun Lake, into which Kherlen flows, will overflow at its northern shore through the arroyo of Mutnaya Protoka, and the water will meet the Argun River (Ergune) after about 30 kilometres (19 mi). The Amur Basin of the Kherlen River−Argun/Ergune River−Amur River system has a total length of 5,052 kilometres (3,139 mi) to its river mouth on the Sea of Japan.

Tributaries

The largest tributaries of the Amur are, from source to mouth:

 Argun (right)
 Shilka (left)
 Amazar (left)
 Oldoy (left)
 Huma (right)
 Zeya (left)
 Bureya (left)
 Songhua (right)
 Bira (left)
 Ussuri (right)
 Tunguska (left)
 Anyuy (right)
 Gur (right)
 Gorin (left)
 Amgun (left)

There are also numerous lakes in the floodplain of the Amur. Some of the largest ones are Bolon, Khummi and Udyl.

History and context
Many historical references distinguish two geopolitical entities in the area of the Amur: Outer Manchuria (Russian Manchuria) and Inner Manchuria (northeast China). The Chinese province of Heilongjiang on the south bank of the river takes its name from the river, as does the Russian Amur Oblast on the north bank. The native Manchu people and their Qing Empire of China, who regarded this river as sacred, use the name Sahaliyan Ula (Black River).

The Amur is an important symbol of, and geopolitical factor in, Chinese–Russian relations. The Amur became especially prominent in the period of the Sino–Soviet political split of 1956–1966.

For many centuries, inhabitants of the Amur Valley comprised the Tungusic (Evenki, Solon, Ducher, Jurchen, Nanai, Ulch), Mongol (Daur) people, some Ainu and, near its mouth, the Nivkhs. For many of these groups, fishing in the Amur and its tributaries was the main source of their livelihood. Until the 17th century these peoples were not known to Europeans, and little known to the Han Chinese, who sometimes collectively described them as the Wild Jurchens. The Chinese-language term Yúpí Dázi 魚皮韃子 ("Fish-skin Tatars") came to apply to the Nanais and related groups as well, owing to their traditional clothes made of fish skins.

The Mongols, ruling the region as the Yuan dynasty, established a tenuous military presence on the lower Amur in the 13th and 14th centuries; ruins of a Yuan-era temple have been excavated near the village of Tyr.

During the reigns of the Yongle and Xuande Emperors (early-15th century), the Ming dynasty reached the Amur in their drive to establish control over the lands adjacent to the Ming Empire to the northeast, which would later become known as Manchuria. Expeditions headed by the eunuch Yishiha reached Tyr several times between 1411 and the early 1430s, re-building (twice) the Yongning Temple and obtaining at least the nominal allegiance of the lower Amur's tribes to the Ming government. Some sources report also a Chinese presence during the same period on the middle Amur – a fort existed at Aigun for about 20 years during the Yongle era on the left (northwestern) shore of the Amur downstream from the mouth of the Zeya River. This Ming Dynasty Aigun was located on the opposite bank to the later Aigun that was later relocated during the Qing Dynasty. In any event, the Ming presence on the Amur was as short-lived as it was tenuous; soon after the end of the Yongle era, the Ming dynasty's frontiers retreated to southern Manchuria. 

Chinese cultural and religious influence such as Chinese New Year, the "Chinese god", Chinese motifs like the dragon, spirals, scrolls, and material goods like agriculture, husbandry, heating, iron cooking-pots, silk, and cotton spread among Amur natives such as the Udeghes, Ulchis, and Nanais.

Russian Cossack expeditions led by Vassili Poyarkov and Yerofey Khabarov explored the Amur and its tributaries in 1643–44 and 1649–51, respectively. The Cossacks established the fort of Albazin on the upper Amur, at the site of the former capital of the Solons.

At the time, the Manchus were busy with conquering China; but a few decades later, during the Kangxi era of 1661–1722, they turned their attention to their north-Manchurian backyard. Aigun was re-established near the supposed Ming site in about 1683–84, and a military expeditions went upstream to dislodge the Russians, whose Albazin establishment deprived the Manchu rulers of the tribute of sable pelts that the Solons and Daurs of the area would supply otherwise. Albazin fell during a short military campaign in 1685. The Treaty of Nerchinsk, concluded in 1689, marked the end of the hostilities: it left the entire Amur valley, from the convergence of the Shilka and the Ergune downstream, in Chinese hands.

Fedor Soimonov was sent to map the then little explored area of the Amur in 1757. He mapped the Shilka, which was partly in Chinese territory, but was turned back when he reached its confluence with the Argun. The Russian proselytization of Orthodox Christianity to the indigenous peoples along the Amur was viewed as a threat by the Qing.

The Amur region remained a relative backwater of the Qing Empire for the next century and a half, with Aigun being practically the only major town on the river. Russians re-appeared on the river in the mid-19th century, forcing the Manchus to yield all lands north of the river to the Russian Empire by the Treaty of Aigun (1858). Lands east of the Ussuri and the lower Amur were acquired by Russia as well, by the Convention of Peking (1860).

Wildlife
It is believed there are at least 123 species of fish from 23 families inhabiting the Amur. The majority are of the Gobioninae subfamily of Cypriniformes, followed in number by Salmonidae. Several of the species are endemic. Pseudaspius and Mesocottus are monotypic genera found only in the Amur and some nearby coastal rivers.

Four species of the Acipenseridae family can be found: the kaluga, Amur sturgeon, Sakhalin sturgeon and sterlet. The Kaluga and Amur sturgeon are endemic. The sterlet was introduced from the Ob in the 1950s.

Direction

The Amur has always been closely associated with the island of Sakhalin at its mouth, and most names for the island, even in the languages of the indigenous peoples of the region, are derived from the name of the river: "Sakhalin" derives from a Tungusic dialectal form cognate with Manchu sahaliyan ("black", as in sahaliyan ula, "Black River"), while Ainu and Japanese "Karaputo" or "Karafuto" is derived from the Ainu name of the Amur or its mouth. Anton Chekhov vividly described the Amur in writings about his journey to Sakhalin Island in 1890.

The maximum runoff measured occurred in Oct 1951 with  whereas the minimum discharge was recorded in March 1946 with a mere .

Bridges and tunnels
In 1941 a railway tunnel was added as well.

Later, a combined road and rail bridge over the Amur at Komsomolsk-on-Amur (1975; 1400 m) and the road and rail Khabarovsk Bridge (1999; 3890 m) were constructed.

The Tongjiang-Nizhneleninskoye railway bridge was proposed in 2007 by Valery Solomonovich Gurevich, the vice-chairman of the Jewish Autonomous Oblast in Russia. The railway bridge over the Amur will connect Tongjiang with Nizhneleninskoye, a village in the Jewish Autonomous Oblast. The Chinese portion of the bridge was finished in July 2016. In December 2016, work began on the Russian portion of the bridge. Completion of structural link between the two sides of  the bridge was completed in March 2019. Opening to rail traffic has been repeatedly delayed, with the December 2019 estimate being "the end of 2020", and then 3rd quarter of 2021.

See also

References

Further reading
 also 
 

 McAleavy, Henry. "China and the Amur Provinces" History Today (June 1964) 14#6 pp 381–390.

External links

Amur-Heilong River Basin Information Center - maps, GIS data, environmental data
Information and a map of the Amur’s watershed

River
Rivers of China
Amu
Border rivers
China–Russia border
International rivers of Asia
Geography of Northeast Asia
Geography of Northeast China
Rivers of Inner Mongolia
Rivers of Khabarovsk Krai
Rivers of Heilongjiang
Rivers of Amur Oblast
Rivers of Zabaykalsky Krai
Rivers of Jewish Autonomous Oblast